The 2021 season was Sabah's sixth competitive season in the highest tier of Malaysian football since the foundation of Malaysia Super League in 2004. It is also the second season for Sabah to play in Malaysia Super League after winning the 2019 Malaysia Premier League which got promoted.

Players

First-team squad 

2021

Out on loan

Squad statistics

Appearances and goals

Competitions

Malaysia Super League

League table

Fixtures and Results

Malaysia Cup

Group stage

The draw for the group stage was held on 15 September 2021.

Knockout stage

Quarter-finals

References

2021
Sabah